V. K. Krishnamurthy was an Indian politician and former Member of the Legislative Assembly of Tamil Nadu. He was elected to the Tamil Nadu legislative assembly as an Indian National Congress candidate from Ambur constituency in 1957 election. He was one of the two winners and the other being S. R. Munusamy.

References 

Indian National Congress politicians from Tamil Nadu
Possibly living people
Year of birth missing
Place of birth missing